Kaalam Maari Pochu may refer to:

 Kaalam Maari Pochu (1956 film), the 1956 film
 Kaalam Maari Pochu (1996 film), the 1996 film